Caladenia ancylosa, commonly known as the Genoa spider orchid, is a plant in the orchid family Orchidaceae and is endemic to Victoria. It is a ground orchid with a single hairy leaf and a single cream-coloured flower with red markings.

Description

The labellum is cream-coloured at its base but red nearer the tip. There are 7 to 10 pairs of calli along the edge of the labellum, decreasing in length towards its front. There are six rows of foot-shaped calli in the centre of the labellum, also smaller towards the tip. Flowering occurs in September and October.

Taxonomy and naming
The species was first formally described by David L. Jones in 2006 and given the name Arachnorchis ancylosa. The description was published in Australian Orchid Research. In 2007, Gary Backhouse changed the name to Caladenia ancylosa and the change was published in The Victorian Naturalist. Jones derived the specific epithet (ancylosa) "from the Greek ancylosis, stiffening of the joints; in reference to the stiffly spreading lateral sepals and petals".

Distribution and habitat
Caladenia ancylosa is only known from far east Gippsland where it grows in the shrub layer of tall open forest near Genoa.

Conservation
This species is classified as "Vulnerable"  by the Victorian government.

References

ancylosa
Plants described in 1994
Endemic orchids of Australia
Orchids of Victoria (Australia)
Taxa named by David L. Jones (botanist)